Qeshlaq-e Nariman Kandi Amir Aslan (also Romanized as Qeshlāq-e Narīmān Kandī Amīr Āṣlān) is a village in Qeshlaq-e Sharqi Rural District, Qeshlaq Dasht District, Bileh Savar County, Ardabil Province, Iran. At the 2006 census, its population was 43, in 11 families.

References 

Towns and villages in Bileh Savar County